The 2022–23 Princeton Tigers Men's ice hockey season was the 120th season of play for the program and the 61st in the ECAC Hockey conference. The Tigers represented the Princeton University, played their home games at the Hobey Baker Memorial Rink and were coached by Ron Fogarty, in his 8th season.

Season
After possessing little to no offense over the previous four seasons, Princeton finally began to see some improvement in 2023. While the team still averaged less than 3 goals per game over the course of the season, the Tigers managed to score 19 more goals than they had in 2022. Ian Murphy led the team's offense, but the addition of Brendan Gorman to the lineup appeared to finally help his older brother Liam begin to live up to his position as the program's only NHL draft pick. The defense, meanwhile, did an excellent job by limiting the chances of their opponents; Princeton allowed less than 28 shots against per game. The story of the season, however, was in goal.

After a bit of a sluggish start, Ethan Pearson posted back-to-back shutouts to stake a claim on the starting role in net. Following a predictable pair of losses to Quinnipiac, he recorded his third zero of the year against a ranked RIT squad and took a stranglehold on the Tiger crease. Princeton saw its best stretch of hockey in years as the Tigers went 8–3 over a 9-week period. The team managed to get above .500 and were in position to potentially get a bye into the ECAC quarterfinals, something they hadn't done since 2009.

In early February, after a slight decline in their performance, Princeton's season was dealt a mortal blow. In a game against St. Lawrence, Pearson went down with an injury on the Larries' second goal and would miss the remainder of the season. Without a third goaltender on the roster, Benjamin Crewe was brought in to be the backup from the school's club team, though that was only for emergency purposes. Aidan Porter was put in goal for the remainder of the season and results were not good.

In the final six games, Princeton went 1–5 while allowing more than 4 goals against per game. They slid down the ECAC standings, not only losing out on the possibility of a bye but also having to travel for the first round series. The reeling Tigers headed up to Schenectady to take on Union. Though they again allowed 4 goals in the match, Murphy's 3-point night heped spark the team to a 6–4 victory. They advanced to face Harvard in the quarterfinals and were completely outmatched by the Crimson. The Tigers dropped a pair of 1–6 decisions to meekly bow out of the postseason.

Departures

Recruiting

Roster
As of September 8, 2022.

Standings

Schedule and results

|-
!colspan=12 style=";" | Regular Season

|-
!colspan=12 style=";" |

Scoring statistics

Goaltending statistics

Rankings

Note: USCHO did not release a poll in weeks 1, 13, or 26.

References

2022-23
Princeton Tigers
Princeton Tigers
Princeton Tigers
Princeton Tigers